L'Italia c'è is a liberal political party in Italy.

History
After the argument between the former vice secretary Piercamillo Falasca and the secretary Benedetto Della Vedova about the rules for the membership admission for the 2021 More Europe leadership election, Falasca left the party. Falasca then launched European Italy (formerly presented as a list for the Assembly of the founding congress of More Europe) as a fully-fledged association, with the goal of building a new party autonomous from the two main coalitions.

The new party was officially launched on 7 February 2022 by Falasca and Gianfranco Librandi, deputy for Italia Viva.

On 27 July, for the 2022 Italian general election in September, the party rebranded itself as an electoral list called National Civic List following the joining of mayors and local administrators, notably the former mayor of Parma and leader of Italia in Comune, Federico Pizzarotti. The party sought an alliance with the Centre-left coalition, but they instead decided to run with Matteo Renzi's Italia Viva party instead due to their refusal to join the Civic Commitment list led by Luigi Di Maio. Separately from Pizzarotti, another leading member of Italia in Comune, Alessio Pascucci, organised the National Civic Agenda/Network and joined Civic Commitment. Later, Pizzarotti and Falasca announced the breakup with Italia Viva and Action due to not having received offers of nominations in competitive constituencies. However, another leading member of LIC, Gianfranco Librandi, will stand as a candidate for the liberal More Europe (+E).

See also
Liberalism and radicalism in Italy
List of political parties in Italy

References

External links

2022 establishments in Italy
Political parties established in 2022
Liberal parties in Italy
Centrist parties in Italy
Pro-European political parties in Italy